Chantilly may refer to:

Places

France 

Chantilly, Oise, a city located in the Oise department
US Chantilly, a football club
Château de Chantilly, a historic château located in the town of Chantilly

United States 

Chantilly, Missouri, an unincorporated community
Chantilly (Charlotte neighborhood), a neighborhood in Charlotte, North Carolina
Chantilly, Virginia, an unincorporated area located in Fairfax County, Virginia
Chantilly High School, a public high school located in Chantilly, Virginia and the Fairfax County Public Schools system
Chantilly (Montross, Virginia), a historic archaeological site near Montross, Virginia

Other 
Battle of Chantilly, a battle in the American Civil War in Chantilly, Virginia
Chantilly Codex, a late medieval manuscript, and the primary source of music in the ars subtilior style
Chantilly Conferences, during World War I
Chantilly cream, a synonym for whipped cream
Chantilly lace, a handmade bobbin lace from Chantilly, Oise
Chantilly Lace (film), a 1993 film
"Chantilly Lace" (song), a 1958 song by The Big Bopper
Chantilly porcelain, a manufactory in the grounds of the château, 1730 onward
Chantilly Racecourse, a thoroughbred turf racecourse for flat racing in Chantilly, Oise
Chantilly-Tiffany, a breed of domestic cat
Chantilly cake, one of several varieties of cake